Ctenochaetus cyanocheilus, is a marine reef tang in the fish family Acanthuridae, endemic to Oceania. It is also known commonly as the bluelip bristletooth. This fish grows to 6.3 inches (16 cm) in the wild.

References

 FishBase

Acanthuridae
Fish described in 2001